Ronald Jason Eldard (born February 20, 1965) is an American actor.

Early life
Eldard was born on Long Island, New York. He is the sixth of seven children, and has four sisters and two brothers. He is of Irish and Scottish descent. Eldard's mother died in a car accident when he was a child, and Eldard and his siblings were sent to live with various family members. He attended grade school in Utah while living with his aunt and uncle.

Career
Eldard made his film debut in the comedy True Love (1989), written and directed by Nancy Savoca, and co-starring Annabella Sciorra. This film won the Grand Jury Prize at the Sundance Film Festival. Eldard has performed on Broadway in critically acclaimed productions of On the Waterfront, Biloxi Blues, Bash: Latterday Plays, and Death of a Salesman. The latter two were filmed for Showtime productions.

Eldard is known for his film roles as Mickey Bunce in the cult comedy Drop Dead Fred (1991); as street thug John Reilly in Sleepers (1996), and as Dodge, a Marine Salvage Expert, in the horror film Ghost Ship (2002).

Beginning January 11, 2006, he starred as Father Flynn in the Tony Award– and Pulitzer Prize–winning Broadway production of Doubt, opposite the British actress Dame Eileen Atkins.  He was scheduled to assume the role for the January 10 performance, but was ill.  The production closed July 2, 2006. In 2014, he starred in the indie horror film Poker Night.

Personal life
Eldard was in a relationship with his ER co-star Julianna Margulies from 1991 to 2003.

Filmography

References

External links

1965 births
Boxers from New York (state)
American male film actors
American male stage actors
American male television actors
American people of Irish descent
American people of Scottish descent
Living people
People from Ridgewood, Queens
State University of New York at Purchase alumni
Male actors from New York (state)
People from Long Island
20th-century American male actors
21st-century American male actors
American male boxers